In mathematics, the indefinite product operator is the inverse operator of . It is a discrete version of the geometric integral of geometric calculus, one of the non-Newtonian calculi. Some authors use term discrete multiplicative integration.

Thus

More explicitly, if , then

If F(x) is a solution of this functional equation for a given f(x), then so is CF(x) for any constant C. Therefore, each indefinite product actually represents a family of functions, differing by a multiplicative constant.

Period rule

If  is a period of function  then

Connection to indefinite sum

Indefinite product can be expressed in terms of indefinite sum:

Alternative usage

Some authors use the phrase "indefinite product" in a slightly different but related way to describe a product in which the numerical value of the upper limit is not given.  e.g.

.

Rules

List of indefinite products

This is a list of indefinite products . Not all functions have an indefinite product which can be expressed in elementary functions.

(see K-function)

(see Barnes G-function)

(see super-exponential function)

See also

Indefinite sum
Product integral
List of derivatives and integrals in alternative calculi
Fractal derivative

References

Further reading
 http://reference.wolfram.com/mathematica/ref/Product.html -Indefinite products with Mathematica
  - bug in Maple V to Maple 8 handling of indefinite product
 Markus Müller. How to Add a Non-Integer Number of Terms, and How to Produce Unusual Infinite Summations
 Markus Mueller, Dierk Schleicher. Fractional Sums and Euler-like Identities

External links
 Non-Newtonian calculus website

Mathematical analysis
Indefinite sums
Indefinite sums
Non-Newtonian calculus